Most Happy Fellows is the Barbershop quartet that won the 1977 SPEBSQSA international competition in Philadelphia.

Lead, Larry Hassler went on to marry the daughter of Baritone Jack Lyon. Tom Wilkie joined the quartet at Bass upon the passing of Ken Hawkinson (1996–2007).  Since the 1990s, Matthew Rice became the lion in the Wizard of Oz Package, taking over the bass voice part.

Discography
Most Happy Fellows, AIC Masterworks CD
Most Happy Fellows & Chicago News, cassette
At Ease, LP/cassette
Thanks For The Memories, LP/cassette
We're Off To See The Wizard, LP/cassette

They also appear on Showtime at Seaside (1995; cassette) by QCED (Quartet Champions of the Evergreen District).

See also
Barbershop music
Barbershop Harmony Society
List of quartet champions by year

External links
 AIC entry (archived)
 Discography from  Mike Barkley's Monster list

Barbershop quartets
Barbershop Harmony Society